S/S Orion is a steam-powered ship moored on the western shore of the islet Skeppsholmen in central Stockholm, Sweden. It is a listed historic ship of Sweden.

History
S/S Orion was built in 1929 at Helsingborgs Varfs AB shipyard in Helsingborg. It was a service ship for the Swedish Maritime Administration used for conducting inspections.  S/S Orion served the Trosa - Karlskrona Pilot District  between 1929 and 1956, with a home port in Kalmar. The vessel was used to inspect lighthouses, pilotage sites and to lay out and pick up buoys and to refill gas in lighthouses. She was decommissioned in 1979, and since 1993 has been a museum ship in the Skeppsholmen quay-berths.

Gallery

See also 
Swedish Maritime Administration
List of museum ships

References

External links
S/S Orion website 

1929 ships
Museum ships in Sweden
Steamships of Sweden
Museums in Stockholm